Bikramganj Lok Sabha constituency was a Lok Sabha (parliamentary) constituency in Bihar state in eastern India. It was abolished in 2008.

Assembly segments
Bikramganj Lok Sabha constituency comprised the following six Vidhan Sabha (legislative assembly) segments:
 Piro
 Karakat
 Bikramganj
 Dinara
 Nokha
 Dehri

Members of Parliament
Following is the list of the Members of Parliament, who represented Bikramganj constituency:

1952-61:Constituency does not exist
1962: Ram Subhag Singh, Indian National Congress
1967: Shiopujan Shastri, Indian National Congress
1971: Shiopujan Shastri, Indian National Congress
1977: Ram Awadhesh Singh, Bharatiya Lok Dal
1980: Tapeshwar Singh, Indian National Congress (Indira)
1984: Tapeshwar Singh, Indian National Congress
1989: Ram Prasad Singh, Janata Dal
1991: Ram Prasad Singh, Janata Dal
1996: Kanti Singh, Janata Dal
1998: Bashishtha Narain Singh, Samata Party
1999: Kanti Singh, Rashtriya Janata Dal
2004: Ajit Kumar Singh, Janata Dal (United)
2008 onwards:Constituency does not exist

See also
 Rohtas district
 List of Constituencies of the Lok Sabha

References

Rohtas district
Former Lok Sabha constituencies of Bihar
Former constituencies of the Lok Sabha
2008 disestablishments in India
Constituencies disestablished in 2008